The 2004 NPF Draft denotes a series of player drafts as a part of the launch of the NPF inaugural season.
On December 6, 2003 in conjunction with the National Fastpitch Coaches Association National Convention at the Del Lago Resort in Montgomery, Texas the eight original NPF teams (Akron, Arizona, Colorado, New England, New York/New Jersey, Sacramento, San Antonio, and Texas ) selected players in two drafts: a four-round Elite Draft that selected players who had completed their college eligibility and a six-round College Senior Draft which selected players in their final year of college.  Athletes are not allowed by the NCAA to sign professional contracts until their collegiate seasons have ended.

After the decision was made to launch the 2004 season without the Colorado Altitude and San Antonio Armadillos, a Supplemental Draft  was held to allocate players whose rights were held by Colorado and San Antonio.

San Antonio selected Michigan State 1B, and Indiana assistant coach Stacey Phillips with the first overall selection in the Elite Draft. In the College Senior Draft Iyhia McMichael of Mississippi State was selected first by the Akron Racers.
For the first pick of the Supplemental Draft, New England chose Georgia Tech's Tara Knudsen whose rights were previously held by San Antonio.

2004 NPF Draft
Position key: 
C = Catcher; UT = Utility infielder; INF = Infielder; 1B = First base; 2B =Second base SS = Shortstop; 3B = Third base; OF = Outfielder; RF = Right field; CF = Center field; LF = Left field;  P = Pitcher; RHP = right-handed Pitcher; LHP = left-handed Pitcher; DP =Designated player
Positions are listed as combined for those who can play multiple positions.

Elite Draft

Following are the 32 selections from the 2004 NPF Elite Draft:

Round 1

Round 2

Round 3

Round 4

Senior Draft
Following are the 48 selections from the 2004 NPF Senior Draft:

Round 1

Round 2

Round 3

Round 4

Round 5

Round 6

Supplemental Draft
Following are the 17 selections from the 2004 NPF Supplemental Draft:

References 

2004 in softball
National Pro Fastpitch drafts